Karl Friedrich von Lindenau (1746 – 21 February 1817) served in the Prussian army before an incident compelled him to switch allegiance to Habsburg Austria in 1789. A staff officer at the beginning of the French Revolutionary Wars, he was asked to mentor the young Archduke Charles, Duke of Teschen. The association with Charles lasted for the rest of Lindenau's military career. After being promoted to general officer in 1797, he led a brigade during the 1799 campaign and was elevated in rank to division commander. In 1803 he was appointed Proprietor (Inhaber) of an infantry regiment. In 1805 he fought with distinction while leading a grenadier division in Italy. The 1809 campaign found him leading an infantry division in Germany, after which he retired from active service.

References
 Arnold, James R. Crisis on the Danube. New York: Paragon House, 1990. 
 Bowden, Scotty & Tarbox, Charlie. Armies on the Danube 1809. Arlington, Texas: Empire Games Press, 1980.
 Petre, F. Loraine. Napoleon and the Archduke Charles. New York: Hippocrene Books, (1909) 1976.
 Rothenberg, Gunther E. Napoleon's Great Adversaries, The Archduke Charles and the Austrian Army, 1792-1814. Bloomington, Ind.: Indiana University Press, 1982 
 Schneid, Frederick C. Napoleon's Italian Campaigns: 1805-1815. Westport, Conn.: Praeger Publishers, 2002. 
 Smith, Digby. Compiled by Leopold Kudrna. Bibliographical Dictionary of all Austrian Generals during the French Revolutionary and Napoleonic Wars 1792-1815: Karl von Lindenau

Prussian Army personnel
18th-century German military personnel
Austrian Empire military personnel of the French Revolutionary Wars
Austrian Empire commanders of the Napoleonic Wars
1746 births
1817 deaths